Saado is a given name and surname. Notable persons with the name may include:

Saado Ali Warsame (1950–2014), Somali-American singer-songwriter and politician
Saado Abdel Salam Fouflia (born 1997), Palestinian footballer 
Yehuda Saado (born 1983), Israeli singer, winner of the Israeli music competition program Kokhav Nolad

See also
Saad